The Woman of My Life is a French film by Régis Wargnier released in 1986.

Plot 
Simon is a famous violinist who became a drunkard. His wife Laura created seven years earlier a classical orchestra of which he was one of the three pillars. After an attack of delirium tremens, he meets Pierre, a former alcoholic, who was able to overcome his habit, and who decides to help Simon. This would change his relationship with Laura, who has always tried in vain to save Simon from his addiction, and is resentful of a stranger's success. She becomes deeply jealous, and unconsciously starts to do everything to get Simon back into alcoholism.

Cast 
Christophe Malavoy as Simon
Jane Birkin as Laura
Jean-Louis Trintignant as Pierre
Béatrice Agenin as Marion
Andrzej Seweryn as Bernard
Didier Sandre as Xavier
Dominique Blanc as Sylvia
Jacques Mercier as Jacques, conductor of the Orchestre National d'Ile de France
Elsa Lunghini as Eloise (Elsa)
Florent Pagny as Serge
Nada Strancar as Nathalie
Jeremy Paris as Stephen
Gregory Bismuth as Benoit

Accolades 
With La Femme de ma vie director Régis Wargnier won the 1987 César Award for Best Debut.

Soundtrack 
T'en va pas, a duet by Jane Birkin and Elsa Lunghini written for a scene in the film song, was re-recorded in a discography version that would become the first major success of the singer Elsa, who at the time was 13 years old.

References

External links 

1986 films
Films about alcoholism
Films about classical music and musicians
Films directed by Régis Wargnier
1980s French-language films
French drama films
Best First Feature Film César Award winners
1986 drama films
1986 directorial debut films
1980s French films